Crufomate is an insecticide.

Potentially toxic to humans, the National Institute for Occupational Safety and Health has set a time-weighted average exposure limit of 5 milligrams per cubic meter, with a short-term limit of up to 20 milligrams per cubic meter for brief exposures of no longer than 15 minutes.

Routes of exposure to crufomate include inhalation, eye contact, skin absorption, and ingestion. Symptoms include eye irritation, loss of appetite, nausea, diarrhea, abdominal cramps, perspiration, lacrimation, blurred vision, dyspnea, wheezing, and respiratory and skin irritation. First aid measures include artificial respiration to treat inhalation exposures, eye irrigation for eye exposures, and immediate washing with soap for skin exposure. Immediate medical attention should be sought if crufomate is swallowed.

References 

Organophosphate insecticides
Chlorobenzenes
Tert-butyl compounds
Phosphoramidates
Phenol esters
Methyl esters